Hitak may refer to:
 Hitak, Dalgan
 Hitak, Nik Shahr